Kevin McCann (born 10 June 1953) is a Scottish professional footballer who played as a winger for Carluke Rovers, Airdrieonians, Queen of the South, Stenhousemuir and Workington.

References

1953 births
Living people
Scottish footballers
Carluke Rovers F.C. players
Airdrieonians F.C. (1878) players
Queen of the South F.C. players
Stenhousemuir F.C. players
Workington A.F.C. players
Scottish Football League players
Association football wingers